Andres Solomon (November 30, 1905 – November 3, 1952), better known by his stage name Togo, was a Filipino actor, comedian and vaudevillian, famous as one half of the comedy team Pugo and Togo during the 1930s to 1950s until his death, which he was being replaced by Bentot from 1952.

As an actor, Solomon performed in movies such as Kambal Tuko, released in 1952, in which he portrayed Popoy, Death March (1946), and Arimunding-Munding (1938).

Death
Solomon died of a heart attack on November 3, 1952, during the filming of Dalawang Sundalong Kanin, 27 days before his 47th birthday.

Legacy
Following Togo's death, LVN Pictures produced a short film on the life and death of the comedian and showed it as an added featurette of the movie.  Pugo & his fellow on screen comedian partner Togo were both posthumously featured on the YouTube channel Graveyard Pinoy TV, a Filipino inspired version of Graveyard Hollywood TV of California was launched in 2020.

References

External links

1905 births
1980 deaths
20th-century Filipino male actors
Burials at the Manila North Cemetery
Filipino male comedians
Filipino male film actors
Filipino male silent film actors
Filipino male stage actors
Silent film comedians
Vaudeville performers
20th-century comedians